The Institute of Management of Sri Lanka (IMSL) is the national professional association in the field of management in Sri Lanka. It was inaugurated on 31 July 1986 and incorporated by Act of Parliament No. 67 on 17 December 1988, succeeding the Sri Lanka Management Association which was formed on 5 May 1978. It is a full member of the Asian Association of Management Organisations (AAMO), representing Sri Lanka.

Membership
IMSL has three grades of members;
 Fellow - FMIM(SL)
 Member - MIM(SL)
 Associate Member - AMIM(SL).

References

External links
IMSL Website

Professional associations based in Sri Lanka
Management organizations
Organizations established in 1986
1986 establishments in Sri Lanka